Electric Religion is the seventh studio album by Praga Khan. It was released in 2004 and also contained two behind the scenes videos from Praga Khan's tours.

Track listing
 "Supermodel" – 3:29	
 "Give Me a Reason" – 3:39	
 "2004 (Life)" (Extended Club Mix) – 6:33	
 "Hollywood" – 4:06	
 "Naked" – 3:40	
 "The Test of Life" – 4:26	
 "Lord, Lord, Lord" – 4:28	
 "Love and Hate" – 5:57	
 "Temptation" – 3:39	
 "Mistress of Dreams" – 5:05	
 "Time" – 4:11	
 "Sugar Sugar" – 3:24

Notes

2004 albums
Praga Khan albums